North Bay Transit provides bus services within the city limits of North Bay, Ontario, Canada. Para-Bus vehicles are also available to serve physically challenged individuals. It operates as a city department, out of the transit terminal on Oak Street at Wyld Street.

History
North Bay transit services since the Second World War
1946 - 1960 Palangios' DeLuxe Coach Lines
1960 - 1968 McCarthy Bus Service
1968 - 1972 Charterways Transportation Limited
1972 - to present operated by the city

Fares
Cash fare (including paratransit) is $3.00 for all riders with a 10 ride multiple fare punch card costing $27.00. Monthly transit passes are priced at $86.00 for adults, $65.00 for students and $55.00 for children, with a term pass available during the school year.

Scheduled Services

Para-Bus
People who are physically unable to board a conventional transit bus or cannot walk a distance of more than 175 metres are eligible to use the Para-Bus service, which is operated by the Physically Handicapped Adults' Rehabilitation Association (PHARA) on behalf of the city. Those who are eligible must be registered to make use of this service.

Although North Bay Transit's newer buses are accessible, PHARA operates a fleet of minibuses to provide more seating for those with physical disabilities.

See also

 Public transport in Canada

References

External links
 North Bay Transit Photos

Transit agencies in Ontario
Bus transport in Ontario
Companies based in North Bay, Ontario
Transport in North Bay, Ontario